SupportSave Solutions, Inc. (NASDAQ BB: SSVE) is a US-based offshore business process outsourcing (BPO) company that provides customer relationship management services, transcription and captioning, and back office support. The company serves clients in a variety of industries such as travel and hospitality, financial services, technology, telecommunications, consumer products, healthcare and insurance, entertainment and education, and law enforcement.

SupportSave is based in Los Angeles, California, but it also holds operations in the Philippines. For its fiscal year ending May 31, 2009, SupportSave reported 96% revenue growth over its previous fiscal year.

Corporate affairs

Current executives 

 Christopher Johns, Founder, Chairman, and Chief Executive Officer
 Rahul Singh, General Manager

History
SupportSave was founded on May 2, 2007, by Christopher Johns. Its original business model was to provide outsourced web-based customer management services to internet-based companies via chat and e-mail. During that period, SupportSave had 100 clients and 400 employees and was essentially a call center taking no calls. Today SupportSave has over 1500 employees, operates on 3 continents and serves companies in retail, e-retail, technology, energy and travel. Its clients include; Office Depot, OfficeMax, Greyhound Lines, DocuSign, Harvard Business Publishing, US Auto Parts, Yellow Pages (YP.com), Checkpoint Software, Westinghouse, Element and Major Energy.

Notes

External links 
 Official Website
 SEC filings

Companies traded over-the-counter in the United States
Outsourcing companies
2007 establishments in the United States